Ryan McMahon is an Anishinaabe comedian, podcaster, and writer from the Couchiching First Nation. McMahon was born in Fort Frances, Ontario, the oldest of three siblings. McMahon was the first in his family to graduate from high school. He attended the University of Minnesota on a full hockey scholarship and graduated from the Second City Training Center.

He was the host of the 2018 Canadaland podcast Thunder Bay, and its upcoming television documentary adaptation Thunder Bay.

Early life and education
In his September 20, 2018 The Walrus Talks Success presentation in the Isabel Bader Theatre in Toronto, McMahon said that he was the oldest of four children and that he was the first person in his family to graduate from high school. McMahon completed his degree in theatre at the University of Minnesota. He then completed a two-year program at the Second City Conservatory in Toronto, Ontario, with a full scholarship granted by the Toronto Theatre Alliance.

Career
By 2008, McMahon had begun his standup comedy routines. In May 2010, his live performance of Welcome To Turtle Island Too was filmed in St. Albert, Alberta for a CBC television comedy special. In the same year he was included in the New Faces of the Just For Laughs festival in Montreal. In February 2015, CBC Radio 1 national aired an hour-long comedy special of Red Man Laughing , that had been recorded live in 2014 in Edmonton, Alberta. Guests on the show included author Joseph Boyden.
McMahon did an hour-long comedy special called Reconcili-Nation that toured in 2015.

McMahon was also featured as the host of Toronto Indigenous Film-maker Michelle St. John's Colonization Road whose documentary was partially filmed at Lang Pioneer Village. The documentary examined First Nations and settler relations through Ontario's first roadways. The roads were built to make the land accessible for settlers, but ultimately split up and cut off First Nations communities.
The program won the Yorkton Film Festival's Golden Sheaf Award for Best Documentary – Historical/Biography, and was nominated for a 2018 Canadian Screen Award.

In June 2019, CBC Comedy included McMahon on their list of "15 Canadian comedians to watch in 2019".

Podcasts

McMahon, who began podcasting in 2008, relaunched Indian & Cowboy as 'Member Supported Indigenous Media Network' on July 1, 2017, featuring ten podcasts and other web content—supported by members.

His 40-minute podcast, Red Man Laughing, is his most popular podcast, with 20,000 listeners but there was a lack of advertising revenue.  As of 2022 the network had 149 patrons and earns an income of $1,126 US a month on Patreon.
Other podcasts he has been involved with include 2015's Stories from the Land.

In 2016, McMahon began to co-host Canadaland's political show, The Commons.

McMahon proposed a series about Thunder Bay to Jesse Brown, the founder of Canadaland. The series was intended to resemble the American National Public Radio (NPR) "longform storytelling model". Thunder Bay was largely informed by Toronto Star reporter Tanya Talaga's award-winning book  Seven Fallen Feathers: Racism, Death and Hard Truths in a Northern City, which investigated the deaths of seven Indigenous youth in Thunder Bay, Ontario.  Canadaland launched a fundraiser and surpassed their goal of about C$27,800 a month from supporters.  According to a Canadian Press article, by July 2019, McMahon, Jesse Brown, and Northwood Entertainment's Miranda de Pencier were working together to develop the Thunder Bay podcast into a television drama series.

In 2022 McMahon was scheduled to host a new series on Canadaland series, called Canadalandback, but his producer walked off the show, claiming on a widely read Twitter thread that there had been "existing allegations of harm" against McMahon involving women. Subsequently McMahon stepped down himself stating that he was stepping back to deal with his family life and for the good of the show. The CEO of Canadaland Jesse Brown stated he was not aware of any allegations against Ryan concerning physical violence, criminality, harassment, or assault and that "based on the information at hand, this is a personal and private matter that Ryan’s employer should have no role in whatsoever." Previously McMahon had been outspoken in media on issues of harm to, and respect for, Indigenous women.

Opinion essays 
McMahon has written opinion pieces for Vice News, and The Globe and Mail. The speech that McMahon presented at The Walrus Talks Success event on September 20, 2018, in Toronto, was published as an article in Walrus magazine.

On May 26, 2017, as Canada prepared for its sesquicentennial, McMahon's series, entitled 12 Steps to Decolonizing Canada, aired on CBC Radio' Day 6. In it, McMahon charted a "course for the next 150 years" to avoid the mistakes of the previous 150 years in terms of Canada's relationship to Indigenous people. The show received the Sam Ross award for Opinion and Commentary at the 2018 RTDNA awards. He also refused to attend any of the celebrations surrounding the 150th anniversary, according to the non-fiction book 150 Years of Canada: Grappling with Diversity since 1867.

Activism
McMahon has used his writing and podcasts as a platform to express ideas on various subject matters.

In a 2015 interview with Rabble, McMahon said that the Idle No More movement was a turning point for him. By that time, he had 20,000 listeners to his Red Man Laughing podcasts, and he decided to use his platform to speak about Idle No More. In a 2013 podcast shortly after the Idle No More movement had been launched, McMahon said that, for Anishinaabe, everything you do is political.

McMahon had been outspoken against colonial harm to Indigenous women, prior to leaving Canadaland.

On June 7, 2019, CBC radio interview, McMahon discussed the June 3 release of the final report of the National Inquiry into Missing and Murdered Indigenous Women and Girls and the disappointing response to the report by the media.

In June 2020, CBC recommended Michelle St. John's "Colonization Road", which featured McMahon, as one of ten documentaries by Indigenous "activists" who are "advocating for change."

References

External links 
  of Red Man Laughing Podcast
  of Indian & Cowboy Podcast Network on Patreon
  of Makoons Media Group

Canadian stand-up comedians
Saulteaux people
Living people
People from Fort Frances
Comedians from Ontario
1979 births
Minnesota Golden Gophers men's ice hockey players
Canadian podcasters